Céline Walser (born 31 May 1998 in Liestal) is a Swiss professional squash player. As of January 2021, she was ranked number 90 in the world.

References

1998 births
Living people
Swiss female squash players
People from Liestal
Sportspeople from Basel-Landschaft
20th-century Swiss women
21st-century Swiss women
Competitors at the 2022 World Games